This page has a list of all municipal elections in Manitoba.

1977 Manitoba municipal elections
1980 Manitoba municipal elections
1983 Manitoba municipal elections
1986 Manitoba municipal elections
1989 Manitoba municipal elections
1992 Manitoba municipal elections
1995 Manitoba municipal elections
1998 Manitoba municipal elections
2002 Manitoba municipal elections
2006 Manitoba municipal elections
2010 Manitoba municipal elections 
2014 Manitoba municipal elections
2018 Manitoba municipal elections 

Municipal elections in Manitoba